Abdul Salam son of Salih son of Sulayman son of Ayoub son of Musaira Al-Qurashi, Al-Harrati or Al-Harawi, Al-Naisapuuri, the servant of Abdul Rahman son of Samara. Nicknamed: Abu Salt.

His birth 

His birth is mentioned to have occurred in Medina around the year 162 of the Islamic Calendar or in the beginning of the third century of the Islamic Calendar.

His life 
Abu Salt was counted among the special ones from the Shia. He was one of the companions and servants of the Imam Ali son of Musa, Al Redha. He was also one of the narrators who narrated from Imam Al Redha. He has reported the virtues of Ahlul Bait and travelled to Basrah, Kufa, Hijaaz and Yemen to report narrations. Another of his own virtues was that he used to debate the Murji'a, the Jahmiya and the Qadariya sects.

His clashes with Ma'mun 
Al Ma'mun imprisoned him after the martyrdom of Imam Al-Redha. Abu Salt himself said regarding his imprisonment: “He (Ma'mun) ordered for me to be imprisoned. After [[Ali al-Ridha|Imam Al-Redha]] was buried I was imprisoned for a period of time so the imprisonment started to affect me and I felt suppressed. When I started to feel like this I stayed up the night praying to Allah and supplicating. I read a supplication in which I mentioned Mohammad and his Progeny blessings be upon them and I asked Allah to release be for their sake. I did not finish supplicating before Abu Jaffar Mohammad the son of Ali blessings be upon them came to me and said: Oh Abu Salt, you started to feel uncomfortable? I said: Yes by Allah. So he said: Get up and he hit with his hands on my handcuffs and took them off. He then grabbed me by my hand and took me out of the prison whilst the prison guards and workers can see me but they weren't able to do anything and we left. He said to me: Go among this blessed earth of Allah for you will not come across him (the tyrant) nor will he ever get to you. Abu salt says: I have not come across Ma'mun ever since.”

Who he narrated from 
 The Imam Ali Al-Redha
 Ismail son of Ayaash
 Jurair son of Al-Hameed
 Shuraik son of Abdillah Al-Nakha'i

Who narrated from him
 Ibrahim son of Ishaaq Al-Sarraaj
 Ahmad son of Sayaar Al-Merwazi
 Ahmad son of Mansur Al-Remadi
 Mohammad son of Raafi' Al-Naisapuuri

What the scholars have said regarding him
 Sheikh Ahmad Al-Najashi said: “Abdul Salam son of Salih Abu Salt Al Harawi, he is an authentic narrator who narrated correct narrations from Imam Al-Redha.”
 Sheikh Al-Tuusi said: "Ahu Salt, Abdul Salam son of Salih Al-Harawi. He was from the companions of Imam Al-Redha blessings be upon him and he has been certified by a number of scholars. 
 Al-Dhahabi said: "The great worshipping scholar, the scholar of the Shia, Abu salt Abdul Salam son of Salih Al-Harawi. He deserves great respect and honour.

His compilations
Al-Najashi says that he has compiled a book named: The death of Imam Al-Redha.

His death
He died on the 17th day of the month of Shawwaal from the 203rd year of the Islamic Calendar. It was also said that it was the year 207. He died after he left the prisons of Ma'mun and he was buried in the edges of Mashhad in Iran.

References

Arab history
9th-century Arabs